Semaška is a Lithuanian-language surname. Variant: Simaška
Notable people with the surname include:

 (born 1967), Lithuanian diplomat and statesman
Jonas Semaška (1907-1947), Lithuanian officer and Lithuanian independence resistance fighter

Lithuanian-language surnames
lt:Semaška